Gunnar Robert Hedin (born 2 February 1966) is a Swedish handball coach and retired player who won silver medals at the 1992 and 1996 Summer Olympics. He also won a bronze medal at the 1993 World Championships, playing alongside his younger brother Tony. In 2008 he became coach of the Norwegian national handball team.  As of 2018, he is the head coach of the United States men's national handball team.

References

External links 
 

1966 births
Living people
Swedish male handball players
Olympic handball players of Sweden
Handball players at the 1992 Summer Olympics
Handball players at the 1996 Summer Olympics
Olympic silver medalists for Sweden
Swedish handball coaches
Olympic medalists in handball

Medalists at the 1996 Summer Olympics
Medalists at the 1992 Summer Olympics